Swedish jarls were powerful noblemen in Sweden. There usually was only one holder of the title at a time, second only to the King of Sweden.

For special occasions, regional jarls outside of Sweden could be nominated as well.  An example of this is Jon Jarl, who allegedly conducted pirate operations against Novgorod in the east.

History 
According to Procopius, the Heruli, after having raided the European continent for several generations, returned to Scandinavia in 512 as a result of military defeats.  As their old territory was now occupied by the Danes, they settled next to the Geats in present-day Sweden.  No elaborate theory exists to explain how the word came to be used as a title.  Arguably, their knowledge in interpreting runes also meant they were gifted in martial arts and, as they gradually integrated, eril or jarl instead came to signify the rank of a leader.  As described in the Icelandic sagas, such as Rígsthula, a jarl was a sort of chieftain next in rank to the king in the function of Marshal or  Duke of the King's Army.  Under any circumstance, when jarls are finally mentioned in medieval documents, it clearly was a title signifying a leader ranked directly under the king.

In Swedish history, Jarls are described as either local rulers or viceroys appointed by a king, ruling one of the historical Swedish provinces, such as Västergötland, Östergötland, or Svitjod.  In Norway, the jarls apparently kept this role and the kings attempted to introduce one in each Fylke before the title was used exclusively on the Orkney Islands in the 14th century.  In Sweden, however, the title was replaced by "duke" (Swedish 'hertig') in the 13th century. Before the title was discontinued, Swedish jarls were powerful men, such as Birger Brosa, Ulf Fase, and Birger Jarl (original patronym Magnusson), often the true rulers of the Swedish kingdom.

Jarls of Sweden
 Birger Brosa, 1174-1202
 Johan Sverkersson, 1202-120?
 Jon Jarl, ?-1206?
 Knut Birgersson, 120?-1208, killed in 1208 at the Battle of Lena
 Folke Birgersson, 1208–1210, killed in 1210 at the Battle of Gestilren
 Charles the Deaf (Karl Döve), 1210?-1220, killed at the Battle of Lihula
 Ulf Fase, 1220?-? and 1231–1240, died 1248
 Birger Magnusson, 1248–1266, last jarl (Dux Sweciae)

Regional  jarls

Jarls of Västergötland
 Ulf Tostesson
 Ragnvald Ulfsson (c. 1010–20), later jarl of Staraja Ladoga and Ingria. Father of king Stenkil of Sweden.

Other
 Jon Jarl (possibly several ones)
 Roger I of Sicily (Jarl Rogeirr)

In popular culture
 In the History Channel's historical drama television series Vikings, actor Thorbjørn Harr plays the character of Jarl Borg, a Jarl of Götaland.
In the video game The Elder Scrolls V: Skyrim, the rulers of the various cities and their respective regions, called within the game as the nine holds, are known as Jarls.
In the NRK television series Norsemen, there are two jarls: Jarl Varg, the primary antagonist of the show, and Jarl Bjorn, a character in Season 3.

Notes

References 
 

 
Noble titles
Swedish nobility
12th century in Sweden
13th century in Sweden
Men's social titles
Earls

sv:Jarl